The 2019 Bluegreen Vacations 500 was a Monster Energy NASCAR Cup Series race that was held on November 10, 2019, at ISM Raceway in Avondale, Arizona. Contested over 312 laps on the one mile (1.6 km) oval, it was the 35th race of the 2019 Monster Energy NASCAR Cup Series season, ninth race of the Playoffs, and final race of the Round of 8.

Report

Background

ISM Raceway – also known as PIR – is a one-mile, low-banked tri-oval race track located in Avondale, Arizona. It is named after the nearby metropolitan area of Phoenix. The motorsport track opened in 1964 and currently hosts two NASCAR race weekends annually. PIR has also hosted the IndyCar Series, CART, USAC and the Rolex Sports Car Series. The raceway is currently owned and operated by International Speedway Corporation.

The raceway was originally constructed with a  road course that ran both inside and outside of the main tri-oval. In 1991 the track was reconfigured with the current  interior layout. PIR has an estimated grandstand seating capacity of around 67,000. Lights were installed around the track in 2004 following the addition of a second annual NASCAR race weekend.

ISM Raceway is home to two annual NASCAR race weekends, one of 13 facilities on the NASCAR schedule to host more than one race weekend a year. The track is both the first and last stop in the western United States, as well as the fourth and penultimate track on the schedule.

Entry list
 (i) denotes driver who are ineligible for series driver points.
 (R) denotes rookie driver.

Practice

First practice

Final practice

Qualifying

Qualifying results

Race

Stage results

Stage One
Laps: 75

Stage Two
Laps: 75

Final stage results

Stage Three
Laps: 162

Race statistics
 Lead changes: 8 among 5 different drivers
 Cautions/Laps: 5 for 32
 Red flags: 0
 Time of race: 2 hours, 48 minutes and 0 seconds
 Average speed:

Media

Television
NBC Sports will cover the race on the television side. Rick Allen, two–time Phoenix winner Jeff Burton, Steve Letarte and three-time Phoenix winner Dale Earnhardt Jr. had the call in the booth for the race. Dave Burns, Parker Kligerman, Marty Snider and Kelli Stavast reported from pit lane during the race.

Radio
MRN covered the radio call for the race, which was simulcast on Sirius XM NASCAR Radio. Alex Hayden, Jeff Striegle, and Rusty Wallace called the action from the broadcast booth when the field raced down the front straightaway. Dan Hubbard called the action from turns 1 & 2 and Kyle Rickey called the action from turns 3 & 4. Winston Kelley, Steve Post, Kim Coon, and Dillon Welch called the action on MRN from pit lane.

Standings after the race

Manufacturers' Championship standings

Note: Only the first 16 positions are included for the driver standings.

References

2019 in sports in Arizona
Bluegreen Vacations 500
NASCAR races at Phoenix Raceway
Bluegreen Vacations 500